The International Cinematographers Film Festival "Manaki Brothers" (known short as Manaki Film Festival) is an annual international film festival organized by the Macedonian Film Professionals Association (MFPA). The festival is held in Bitola, the town where most of the activities of the Aromanian brothers Yanaki and Milton Manaki were organized. They were the filmmakers, who in 1905 filmed in Avdela the first motion pictures in the Ottoman Balkans. Each year the festival is supported by the Ministry of Culture of Macedonia and the President of North Macedonia. The award of the festival is Camera 300 that given to the year's best motion pictures chosen by the festival's film committee. The Manaki Film Festival has been hosted at the Center of culture, with screenings at the Big Hall, located in the center of Bitola and has been attended by celebrities such as Michael York, Charles Dance, Victoria Abril, Daryl Hannah, Catherine Deneuve, Isabelle Huppert, Julliette Binoche, Aleksei Serebryakov, Bruno Ganz, Claudia Cardinale, Fatih Akin.

Golden Camera 300 for life achievement
1996 Milton Manaki
1997 Ljube Petkovski and Branko Mihajlovski
1998 Sven Nykvist
1999 Jerzy Wojcik
2000 Freddie Francis
2001 Miroslav Ondříček and Henri Alekan
2002 Tonino Delli Colli
2003 Raoul Coutard
2004 Vadim Yusov
2005 Vittorio Storaro
2006 Michael Ballhaus
2007 Anatoli Petritsky
2008 Walter Carvalho
2009 Billy Williams and Peter Suschitzky
2010 Vilmos Zsigmond
2011 Dante Spinotti
2012 Luciano Tovoli
2013 José Luis Alcaine
2014 Chris Menges
2015 Božidar Nikolić, Jaromír Šofr, Ryszard Lenczewski
2016 Robby Müller, John Seale
2017 Giuseppe Rotunno and  Pierre Lhomme
2018 Roger Deakins  
2019 Edward Lachman and Giorgos Arvanitis
2020 Janusz Kamiński
2021 Christian Berger

Special Golden Camera 300
2000 - Jiří Menzel
2002 - Robby Müller
2003 - Christopher Doyle
2006 - Charles Dance
2007 - Branko Lustig
2008 - Veljko Bulajić and Karen Shakhnazarov
2009 - Victoria Abril and Anthony Dod Mantle
2010 - Daryl Hannah and Roger Pratt
2011 - Bruno Delbonnel and Miki Manojlovic
2012 - Christian Berger and Catherine Deneuve
2013 - Agnès Godard and Isabelle Huppert
2014 - Luca Bigazzi and Juliette Binoche
2015 - Aleksei Serebryakov and Bruno Ganz
2016 - Phedon Papamichael
2017 - Milcho Manchevski
2018 - Claudia Cardinale
2021 - Andrei Konchalovsky
2021 - Jocelyn Pook

Golden Camera 300
 1993 - Vilko Filač for Arizona Dream
 1994 - Gerard Simon for Louis, the Child King
 1995 - Stefan Kullänger for Sommaren
 1996 - Masao Nakabori for Maborosi
 1997 - Sergey Astakhov for Brother
 1998 - Walter Carvalho for Central Station
 1999 - Jacek Petrycki for Journey to the Sun
 2000 - Andreas Höfer for The Three Lives of Rita
 2001 - Ryszard Lenczewski for Last Resort
 2002 - Walter Carvalho for To the Left of the Father
 2003 - Christopher Doyle for Hero and Barry Ackroyd for Sweet Sixteen
 2004 - Rainer Klausmann for Head-On
 2005 - Shu Yang Kong for That
 2006 - Stéphane Fontaine for The Beat That My Heart Skipped
 2007 - Dragan Marković for The Living and the Dead and Jaromír Šofr for I Served the King of England
 2008 - Rodrigo Prieto for Lust, Caution
 2009 - Natasha Braier for The Milk of Sorrow
 2010 - Marin Gschlacht for Women Without Men
 2011 - Fred Kelemen for The Turin Horse
 2012 - Jolanta Dylewska for In Darkness
 2013 - Kiko de la Rica for Blancanieves
 2014 - Valentyn Vasyanovych for The Tribe
 2015 - Mátyás Erdély for Son of Saul
 2016 - Jani-Petteri Passi for The Happiest Day in the Life of Olli Mäki
 2017 - Marcell Rev for Jupiter’s Moon
 2018 - Hong Kyung-pyo for Burning
 2019 - Hélène Louvart for The Invisible Life of Eurídice Gusmão

Silver Camera 300
2011 - Michael Krichman for Quiet Souls
2012 - Alisher Khamidkhadjaev for Living
2013 - Virginie Saint-Martin for Tango Libre
2014 - Ryszard Lenczewski for Ida
2015 - Adam Arkapaw for Macbeth
2016 - Ruben Impens for Belgica
2017 - Reiner Klausmann for In the Fade
2018 - Eric Gautier for Ash Is Purest White
2019 - Dong Jinsong for The Wild Goose Lake

List of festival directors

Before 1993 the festival did not have a director, the function was introduced in 1993.
Boris Nonevski 1993-1995
Gorjan Tozija 1995-1995
Delcho Mihajlov 1996-1998
Vladimir Atanasov 1998-2001
Tomi Salkovski 2001-2009
Labina Mitevska 2009-2014
Dimitar Nikolov 2015–2015
Blagoja Kunovski 2016–2018 
Evgenija Teodosievska 2018-2020 
Simeon Damevski 2021-?

Main competition jury
2021 - Phillip Bergson, Wim Vanacker, Suki Medencevic, Sonja Prosenc, Dimo Popov 
2019 - Edward Lachman, Kaloyan Bozhilov, Dominique Welinski, Fejmi Daut, Nenad Dukic 
2018 - Olympia Mytilinaiou, Rainer Klausmann, Mattias Troelstrup, Rebecca Fayyad Palud, Gjorce Stavreski 
2017 - Paul René Roestad, Luca Coassin, Darijan Pejovski, Jani-Petteri Passi, Erol Zubčević 
2016 - Phedon Papamichael, Claire Pijman, Alin Taşçıyan, Gökhan Tiryaki, Vladimir Samoilovski 
2015 - Božidar Nikolić, Ryszard Lenczewski, Mitko Panov, Hayet Benkara, Ercan Kesal
2014 - Giora Bejach, Rebekah Tolley, Srdjan Dragojevic, Simon Tansek, Lazar Sekulovski
2013 - Jose Luis Alcaine, Amnon Zalait, Bojidar Manov, Elma Tataragic, Dejan Dukovski
2012 - Fred Kelemen, Miladin Colakovic, Damjan Kozole, Ilija Penushliski, Virgine Saint Martin
2011 - Dante Spinotti, Eva Zaoralova, Goce Smilevski, Nigel Walters, Martin Schweighofer
2010 - Vilmos Zsigmond, Pawel Pawlinkowski, Dominique Fury, Natasha Braier, Darko Mitrevski, Christine Dollhofer
2009 - Peter Suschitzky, Slobodan Šijan, Yuri Klimenko, Minas Bakalčev
2004 - César Charlone, Rosanna Seregni, Andreas Fischer-Hansen, Roi Jean, Umberto Rossi
2003 - Willy Kurant, Olinka Vistica, Gábor Medvigy, António Costa
2002 - Robby Müller, Alain Marcoen, Ronald Bergan , Jan Weincke, Antonio Mitrikeski
2001 - Andreas Hoffer, Dominique Bax, Eric Guichard, Aleksandr Bashirov, Dejan Dukovski
2000 - Jaromír Sofr, Jacek Petrycki, John Christian Rosenlund, Jan Hintjens, Ivo Trajkov
1998 - Morten Bruus, Sergei Astakhov, Martin Langer
1997 - Zivko Zalar, Simon Perry, Deborah Young
1996 - Marcel Martin
1995 - Dick Pope, Ron Holloway, Stole Popov

World, regional and national film premiers

2004: "The Great Water" (Големата вода) - National Premiere
2005: "Contact" (Контакт) - World Premiere
2006: "The Secret Book" (Тајната книга) - World Premiere
2010: "Mothers" (Мајки) - National premiere
2012: "The Third Half" (Трето полувреме) - World Premiere
2012: "Balkan Is Not Dead" (Балканот не е мртов) - World Premiere
2013: "The Piano Room" (Соба со пијано)- World Premiere
2014: "To the Hilt" (До балчак) -World Premiere
2014: "Children of the Sun" (Деца на сонцето) - World Premiere
2015: "Lazar" (Лазар) - World Premiere
2016: "The Liberation of Skopje" (Ослободувањето на Скопје) - National Premiere 
2016: "Golden five" (Златна Петорка) - World Premiere

Gallery

References

Film festivals in North Macedonia
Tourist attractions in Bitola
Annual events in North Macedonia
1979 establishments in the Socialist Republic of Macedonia
Film festivals established in 1979
Festivals in Yugoslavia
Aromanians in North Macedonia